Estas (also Romanized as Estās) is a village in Emad Deh Rural District, Sahray-ye Bagh District, Larestan County, Fars Province, Iran. At the 2006 census, its population was 121, in 21 families.

References 

Populated places in Larestan County